Tontelea hondurensis is a species of plant in the family Celastraceae found in Guatemala, Honduras, and Panama.

References

hondurensis
Critically endangered plants
Taxonomy articles created by Polbot